Monica Ungureanu (born 9 January 1988) is a Romanian judoka. She competed at the 2016 Summer Olympics in the women's 48 kg event, in which she was eliminated in the first round by Charline Van Snick.

In 2017, she competed in the women's 48 kg event at the 2017 World Judo Championships held in Budapest, Hungary. In 2021, she competed in the women's 48 kg event at the 2021 World Judo Championships held in Budapest, Hungary.

References

External links
 
 
 

1988 births
Living people
Romanian female judoka
Olympic judoka of Romania
Judoka at the 2016 Summer Olympics
European Games competitors for Romania
Judoka at the 2015 European Games
Judoka at the 2019 European Games
20th-century Romanian women
21st-century Romanian women